Lip flip is a cosmetic procedure that modifies the shape of the lips using botulinum neurotoxin type A and occasionally adding hyaluronic acid fillers.  The procedure is performed in order to increase the size of the lips. The procedure typically involves injection of the neurotoxin along the vermilion border of the lips. This leads to a relaxation of the underlying muscle and eversion of the lip. Hyaluronic acid fillers are sometimes added in order increase volume in the lips.

Aesthetics 
The aim of lip flip is to provide an aesthetic, symmetric, and healthy appearance for the patient.

Materials and techniques 
The primary agents used during the lip flip procedure include:

 Botulinum neurotoxin type A,is a neurotoxic protein produced by the bacterium Clostridium botulinum that temporarily reduces muscle contraction and is used for cosmetic purposes. 
 Hyaluronic acid fillers

Non-surgical alternatives 

 Lip plumper is a cosmetic product used to make lips appear fuller. These products work by irritating the skin of the lips with ingredients such as Capsaicin.  This makes the lips swell, temporarily creating the appearance of fuller lips.
 Suction pumps, a special device for lips uses vacuum pumping to increase blood pressure in each lip and to pull them out a bit, making it quite an instrument to adjust proper lip length/value in a slow determinite step-by-step way.

See also 

 Plastic surgery
 Lip lift

References 

Plastic surgical procedures